The Cozia is a left tributary of the river Bohotin in Romania. It flows into the Bohotin near Gura Bohotin.

References

Rivers of Romania
Rivers of Iași County